Abdur Rouf is an Indian politician belonging to All India United Democratic Front. He was elected as a member of the Assam Legislative Assembly as a United Minorities Front candidate in 1996. He joined Indian National Congress in 2008. He quit the party on 6 September 2019. He joined All India United Democratic Front on 7 October 2019.

References

All India United Democratic Front politicians
Living people
Assam MLAs 1996–2001
Indian National Congress politicians from Assam
Year of birth missing (living people)